Colonelganj is a constituency of the Uttar Pradesh Legislative Assembly covering the town of Colonelganj in the Gonda district of Uttar Pradesh, India.

Colonelganj is one of five assembly constituencies in the Kaiserganj Lok Sabha constituency. Since 2008, this assembly constituency is numbered 298 amongst 403 constituencies.

Election results

2022

2017
Bharatiya Janta Party candidate Ajay Pratap Singh won in last Assembly election of 2017 Uttar Pradesh Legislative Elections defeating Samajwadi Party candidate Yogesh Pratap Singh by a margin of 28,405 votes.

References

External links
 

Assembly constituencies of Uttar Pradesh